The 2013 International Cup of Nice was the 18th edition of an annual international figure skating competition held in Nice, France. It was held on October 23–27, 2013. Medals were awarded in the disciplines of men's singles, ladies' singles, pair skating, and ice dancing on the senior level, and in singles on the junior level.

Entries
The initial entries are:

Senior results

Men

Ladies

Pairs

Ice dancing

Junior results

Men

Ladies

References

External links
 Official site
 Starting orders and results

Coupe Internationale de Nice
Cup of Nice, 2013
Cup of Nice